William Flett may refer to:
 William H. Flett, member of the Wisconsin State Assembly
 William Roberts Flett, Scottish geologist and author
 Bill Flett, Canadian ice hockey player